In enzymology, a thyroid-hormone transaminase is an enzyme that catalyzes the chemical reaction

L-3,5,3'-triiodothyronine + 2-oxoglutarate  3-[4-(4-hydroxy-3-iodophenoxy)-3,5-diiodophenyl]-2-oxopropanoate + L-glutamate

Thus, the two substrates of this enzyme are L-3,5,3'-triiodothyronine and 2-oxoglutarate, whereas its two products are [[3-[4-(4-hydroxy-3-iodophenoxy)-3,5-diiodophenyl]-2-oxopropanoate]] and L-glutamate.

This enzyme belongs to the family of transferases, specifically the transaminases, which transfer nitrogenous groups.  The systematic name of this enzyme class is L-3,5,3'-triiodothyronine:2-oxoglutarate aminotransferase. Other names in common use include 3,5-dinitrotyrosine transaminase, and thyroid hormone aminotransferase.  It employs one cofactor, pyridoxal phosphate.

References

 

EC 2.6.1
Pyridoxal phosphate enzymes
Enzymes of unknown structure